Edward Partherich (c. 1630 – buried 1705), of Littleport, Cambridgeshire, was an English politician.

Family
He was the son of Sir Edward Partherich, also an MP.

Career
He was a Member (MP) of the Parliament of England for Cambridgeshire in March 1679.

References

1630 births
1705 deaths
People from Littleport, Cambridgeshire
English MPs 1679